Kathleen may refer to:

People
 Kathleen (given name)
 Kathleen (singer), Canadian pop singer

Places 

 Kathleen, Alberta, Canada
 Kathleen, Georgia, United States
 Kathleen, Florida, United States
 Kathleen High School (Lakeland, Florida), United States
 Kathleen, Western Australia, Western Australia
 Kathleen Island, Tasmania, Australia
 Kathleen Lumley College, South Australia
 Mary Kathleen, Queensland, former mining settlement in Australia

Other 
 Kathleen (film), a 1941 American film directed by Harold S. Bucquet
 The Countess Kathleen and Various Legends and Lyrics (1892), second poetry collection of William Butler Yeats
 Kathleen Ferrier Award, competition for opera singers
 Kathleen Mitchell Award, Australian literature prize for young authors
 Plan Kathleen, plan for a German invasion of Northern Ireland sanctioned by the IRA Chief of Staff in 1940
 Tropical Storm Kathleen (disambiguation)
 "Kathleen" (song), a song by  Catfish and the Bottlemen
 "Kathleen", song by Wally Lewis
 Typhoon Kathleen, hit Japan in 1947